Berlin Commercial Internet Exchange (BCIX) is a Berlin-based Internet exchange point (IXP) founded in 2002 as a membership organisation and currently has 79 members, making it one of the largest regional IXP in Germany by membership.  BCIX currently operates an Arista Networks and Dell Force10-based infrastructure with DWDM links between nine sites:

 NTT (formerly e-shelter), Nonnendammallee 15, 13599 Berlin
 I/P/B/, Luetzowstrasse 105/106, 10785 Berlin
 DNS:NET, Luetzowstrasse 105/106, 10785 Berlin
 I/P/B/, Kitzingstrasse 15, 12277 Berlin
 euNetworks, Alboinstr. 36, 12103 Berlin
 Speedbone, Alboinstrasse 36, 12103 Berlin
 CenturyLink (formerly Level(3)), Gradestrasse 60, 12347 Berlin
 Colt Datacenter, Wiebestrasse 46-49, 10553 Berlin
 3U Telecom, Lorenzweg 5, 12099 Berlin

References

External links
 Website of the BCIX with traffic statistics
 Member of Euro-IX

Internet exchange points in Germany